Syed Nasim Ahmad Zaidi served as 20th Chief Election Commissioner of India. He is a retired I.A.S. officer of 1976 batch from the Uttar Pradesh cadre.

Education
Zaidi possesses a master's degree in Public Administration from Kennedy School of Government, Harvard University and has been a Mason Fellow for Public Policy at Harvard Institute for International Development.

Career
Dr. Zaidi has served as the Permanent Representative of India on the Council of ICAO from November 2005 to October 2008. He has served as the Director General of Civil Aviation. He retired from IAS as Secretary to the Government of India in Ministry of Civil Aviation on 31 July 2012. The first election in his tenure was 2015 Bihar Legislative Assembly election.

References

Living people
Indian Muslims
Harvard Kennedy School alumni
Indian civil servants
People from Uttar Pradesh
Chief Election Commissioners of India
1952 births
Twelvers
Indian Shia Muslims
Mason Fellows